Ishlya (İşle) is a rural locality (a selo) and the administrative centre of Ishlinsky Selsoviet, Beloretsky District, Bashkortostan, Russia. The population was 436 as of 2010. There are 8 streets.

Geography 
Ishlya is located 48 km west of Beloretsk (the district's administrative centre) by road. Kudashmanovo is the nearest rural locality.

References 

Rural localities in Beloretsky District